Lester Halbert Germer (October 10, 1896 – October 3, 1971) was an American physicist. With Clinton Davisson, he proved the wave-particle duality of matter in the Davisson–Germer experiment, which was important to the development of the electron microscope. These studies supported the theoretical work of De Broglie. He also studied thermionics, erosion of metals, and contact physics. He was awarded the Elliott Cresson Medal in 1931.

A former fighter pilot in World War I, Germer subsequently worked at Bell Labs in New Jersey.

In 1945 (at the age of 49), Germer launched a side career as a rock climber. He climbed widely around the Northeast United States, and especially at New York's Shawangunk Ridge. Although the Appalachian Mountain Club was dominant in the area at the time, and strictly regulated rock climbing, Lester was never associated with the club, and found himself in conflict with the leading climber in the area, Hans Kraus, who was head of the AMC's Safety Committee. He was once turned down for climbing certification with the comment "Likes people too much and is too enthusiastic."  Lester was known for being generous and friendly. He was once called "A one man climbing school."

In 1971, one week before his  75th birthday, Lester Germer died of a massive heart attack while lead climbing a rock climb at the Shawangunk Ridge (Eyebrow, 5.6). Until that moment, Lester had a 26-year perfect safety record in rock climbing; he had never even taken a leader fall.

References

 Schwartz, Susan (2005) Into The Unknown: The Remarkable Life of Hans Kraus 
 Waterman, Laura and Guy (1993) Yankee Rock and Ice

1896 births
1971 deaths
20th-century American physicists
Columbia University alumni
Scientists at Bell Labs
Fellows of the American Physical Society